Forish is a mountain village in Forish District, Jizzakh Region, Uzbekistan. It has approximately 971 inhabitants.

References

Populated places in Jizzakh Region